The Mézga Family (in Hungarian Mézga család) is a fictional family from three animated TV series made by Pannónia Film Studio in Hungary between 1969 and 1978.

Scripts for the series were written by József Romhányi and József Nepp. Nepp also served as the film director. The series proved to be very popular, reaching cult status and televised, among others, in Czechoslovakia, Bulgaria, Romania, Italy, The Netherlands and both German states. The series still regularly appear on television. Each consists of 13 episodes.

The Family
The family consists of Géza, the father, a comical and inept figure, his wife Paula who actually dominates family affairs, pubertal daughter Kriszta and 12-year-old son Aladár, a child prodigy. The cat Maffia and a dog, Blöki accompany the family. Dr. Máris, their cynical neighbour, is regularly and involuntarily involved in disasters surrounding the family.

The name "Mézga" means glue, mucilage or tree gum in Hungarian and was renamed as rodina Smolíkova in Czech, which is a surname (derived from "smůla", i.e. "tree gum" or "bad luck") used also in fairy tales, La famiglia Mezil in Italian, Familie Metzger in German, which means butcher, Семејството Смола in Macedonian, Семейство Мейзга in Bulgarian, Família Mézga/Mesga in Portuguese, and Miazgovci in Slovak. In Dutch, however, they were quite generically named De familie Sanders; which has no further meaning.

The Series

The Mézga family
The first series was shot in 1968/1969 under the name Üzenet a jövőből – A Mézga család különös kalandjai (A message from the future – The fantastic adventures of the Mézga family). The family makes contact with MZ/X, their descendant from the 30th century, with whom child prodigy Aladár made a contact. MZ/X sends them, through time, various hypermodern gadgets which invariably result in a disaster. (An example is when MZ/X sends them something that makes the fruits in the Mézga's fruit garden grow to exceptional size. The family is happy with the enormous fruits until they realize that they forgot to kill the insects and other parasites, and they are chased away by gigantic locusts and worms. In another episode a house cleaning robot destroys the furniture because he doesn't understand commands in 20th century Hungarian language.) Episodes usually end with Paula's catch phrase "Why didn't I marry Pisti Hufnágel?", implying that she often regrets she chose Géza over another suitor. In the third series she finally accepts that Hufnágel is not what she imagined him to be.

The series were named Odkaz budoucnosti aneb Podivuhodná dobrodružství rodiny Smolíkovy in Czech, Messaggi dal futuro in Italian, Heißer Draht ins Jenseits – Phantastische Abenteuer der Familie Mézga in German, Невероятните приключения на Семейство Мейзга: Послания от Бъдещето in Bulgarian  and Miazgovci I in Slovak.

The Adventures of Aladár Mézga
The next series was shot in 1972 under the title Mézga Aladár különös kalandjai (The Adventures of Aladár Mézga). Every night Aladár visits a different inhabited planet using an inflatable interstellar spaceship named Gulliverkli. The name of his ship is a pun on (and a portmanteau of) Gulliver and verkli. This space vehicle, both absurd and futuristic, was presumably built by Aladár, based on parts, supplies, and support provided by MZ/X, however the point is not tackled during the series, leaving the watcher to guess). In this series, Blöki can talk, as Aladár has taught him to speak, so he would make a suitable assistant for space travel. The series satirised various human and societal vices; for this reason, two episodes were not allowed to be shown in communist Czechoslovakia.

The series were named Podivuhodná dobrodružství Vladimíra Smolíka in Czech, L’astronave in Italian, Adolars phantastische Abenteuer in East Germany, Archibald, der Weltraumtrotter in West Germany, Семейство Мейзга: Невероятните приключения на Аладар in Bulgarian, Miazgovci II in Slovak.

The Mézga Family on Holiday
The third series was shot in 1978 under the name Vakáción a Mézga család. Pisti Hufnágel, a character mentioned a few times in the first series, the first love of Paula and her ideal, invites the family to spend holidays in Australia. A spare ticket is given to the neighbour, Dr. Ottokár Máris. It turns out that Hufnágel is a swindler and the Mézgas are left abandoned and penniless. Their effort to get home flings them into the most strange places, including the South Pole, and into bizarre situations. Pisti Hufnágel secretly follows them and always turns their hopes into catastrophe. Only when they finally arrive home and find out their flat has been completely ransacked by Hufnágel does Paula lose her faith in her ideal.

Unlike the first two series, which consisted of one-story episodes, this series is a single story arc.

The series were named Podivuhodné prázdniny rodiny Smolíkovy in Czech, Le vacanze della famiglia Mezil in Italian, Die Abenteuer der Familie Metzger in German, Семейство Мейзга във ваканция in Bulgarian, Miazgovci na cestách in Slovak, De familie Sanders is anders in Dutch, and La Familia Mezga in Spanish.

The Mézga Family and the Computer
During 2005, the Ex-Ist studio prepared a new series under the title A Mézga család és a (sz)ámítógép where the family gets acquainted with computers and the Internet. However, the show was later canceled due to a lack of funding, as the economic situation in Hungary grew worse. Only two fully-animated episodes were made from the original 13-episode order.

References

External links
 
 Info about the series in German (01, 02, 03, 04), Czech, Italian and Romanian

Animated characters
Hungarian animated television series
Hungarian children's television series
Fictional families
Fictional Hungarian people
1969 Hungarian television series debuts
1972 Hungarian television series debuts
1978 Hungarian television series endings
1960s Hungarian television series
1970s Hungarian television series
1960s animated television series
1970s animated television series